The Diving competition in the 1961 Summer Universiade were held in Sofia, Bulgaria.

Medal overview

Medal table

References
 

1961 in water sports
1961 Summer Universiade
1961
1961 in diving